Quassim Cassam,  (born 31 January 1961) is professor of philosophy at the University of Warwick. He writes on self-knowledge, perception, epistemic vices and topics in Kantian epistemology. As blurbed for his book, Vices of the Mind (2019), Cassam defines epistemic vice as "character traits, attitudes or thinking styles that prevent us from gaining, keeping or sharing knowledge".

Early life and education
Quassim Cassam was born in Mombasa, Kenya, to a Gujarati Ismaili family. His parents and grandparents were all born in Kenya. His great grandparents were born in Gujarat, India, and emigrated to Kenya in the 1890s. He was a Kenyan citizen until the age of 18 but has spent most of his adult life in the U.K. He studied Philosophy, Politics and Economics (PPE) at Keble College, Oxford and was awarded an Oxford doctorate in 1985 for a dissertation on transcendental arguments.

Career
From 1986 to 2004 Cassam taught philosophy at Oxford University, where he was a Fellow of Wadham College. In 1993 he was visiting associate professor at the University of California, Berkeley. In 2004 he held the John Evans Distinguished Visiting Professorship in Moral and Intellectual Philosophy at Northwestern University, Illinois.  He was Professor of Philosophy at University College London in 2005-2006 and Knightbridge Professor of Philosophy at Cambridge University in 2007–2008. Since 2009, Cassam has been a professor of philosophy at Warwick University. In 2016 he was awarded a Leadership Fellowship by the Arts and Humanities Research Council in the UK.
He has been a president of the Aristotelian Society (2010–11) and a Mind Senior Research Fellow (2012–13).

On 22 July 2022, Cassam was elected a Fellow of the British Academy (FBA), the United Kingdom's national academy for the humanities and social sciences.

Cassam's early publications were mostly on Kant, including "Transcendental Arguments, Transcendental Synthesis, and Transcendental Idealism" (Philosophical Quarterly, 1987) and "Kant and Reductionism" (Review of Metaphysics, 1989). In recent times he has published work on epistemic vices and introduced the label 'vice epistemology' for the philosophical study of the nature and significance of epistemic vices such as closed-mindedness, overconfidence, dogmatism and wishful thinking 

He is the author of six books: Self and World (Oxford, 1997), The Possibility of Knowledge (Oxford, 2007), Self-Knowledge for Humans (Oxford, 2014), Berkeley's Puzzle: What Does Experience Teach Us? (Oxford, 2014, jointly with John Campbell), and, most recently, two books in applied epistemology: Vices of the Mind: From the Intellectual to the Political (Oxford, 2019), and Conspiracy Theories (Polity, 2019).

He is also the editor of Self-Knowledge (Oxford, 1994) and the author of the Self-Knowledge bibliography in Oxford Bibliographies Online (Oxford, 2010). His 2010 Aristotelian Society Presidential address, "Knowing What You Believe", was published in The Proceedings of the Aristotelian Society, 2011.

Selected publications
 Self-Knowledge (editor), Oxford University Press (1994). 
 Self and World, Oxford University Press (1997). 
 The Possibility Of Knowledge, Clarendon Press (2007). 
 Berkeley's Puzzle: What Does Experience Teach Us? (co-authored with John Campbell), Oxford University Press (2014). 
 Self-Knowledge for Humans, Oxford University Press (2014). 
 Vices of the Mind: From the Intellectual to the Political, Oxford University Press (2019). 
 Conspiracy Theories, Polity Press (2019). 
 Vice Epistemology, Routledge (2020). 
 Extremism: A Philosophical Analysis, Routledge (2021).

References

External links
 Interview with Richard Marshall at 3:16 AM.

British philosophers
1961 births
Kenyan philosophers
British Ismailis
Alumni of Keble College, Oxford
Living people
People from Mombasa
Presidents of the Aristotelian Society
Fellows of Wadham College, Oxford
Knightbridge Professors of Philosophy
Academics of University College London
Academics of the University of Warwick
Kenyan people of Indian descent
Fellows of the British Academy